Gompholobium karijini is a species of flowering plant in the family Fabaceae and is endemic to the north-west of Western Australia. It is an erect, openly-branched shrub with pinnate leaves with five to ten pairs of leaflets, and racemes of yellow to orange and creamy-yellow, pea-like flowers.

Description
There are bracts and bracteoles that fall at the bud stage.

Taxonomy
Gompholobium karijini was first formally described in 2008 by Jennifer Anne Chappill in Australian Systematic Botany from specimens collected in Hamersley Gorge in Karijini National Park in 1991. The specific epithet (karijini) refers to the type location.

The original description included features that apply to the more recently described G. oreophilum.

Distribution and habitat
This pea grows in grassland with scattered trees and shrubs and is only known from Karijini National Park in the Pilbara region of north-western Western Australia.

Conservation status
Gompholobium karijini is classified as "Priority Two" by the Western Australian Government Department of Parks and Wildlife meaning that it is poorly known and from only one or a few locations.

References

karijini
Eudicots of Western Australia
Plants described in 2008